Zoppola (Standard Friulian: ;

The Italian poet Pier Paolo Pasolini wrote a poem called Le gioie di Orcenico ("The joys of Orcenico"), since he lived in Casarsa della Delizia, not far from Zoppola's frazione (hamlet) of Orcenico  from 1943 to 1949.

Main sights
Castello di Zoppola, owned by the patriarch of Aquileia and Cardinal Antonio Panciera. The inner court has frescoes by Pomponio Amalteo
San Martino church
San Michele, church in the frazione of Ovoledo, with 16th-century frescoes and paintings
Sant'Andrea church at Castions, with two canvases by Amalteo and one by Antonio Carneo

International relations

Zoppola is twinned with:
 Tonneins, France, since 1981
 Sankt Georgen am Längsee, Austria, since 1996

People
Celso Benigno Luigi Costantini

References

External links
 Official website

Cities and towns in Friuli-Venezia Giulia